Yeltsovka is a rural locality (a selo) in Kabanovsky Selsoviet, Ust-Kalmansky District, Altai Krai, Russia. The population was 190 as of 2013. There are 2 streets.

Geography 
Yeltsovka is located 23 km south of Ust-Kalmanka (the district's administrative centre) by road. Ust-Kamyshenka is the nearest rural locality.

References 

Rural localities in Ust-Kalmansky District